Eleonora Šomková (in Mácha's Diary as well as in literary books referred to as Lori,  1817 –  1891) was the fiancée of Karel Hynek Mácha. The poet died two days before their intended wedding. Intimate details of their relationship were revealed by deciphering Mácha's Diary of 1835.

Life 
Eleonora Šomkova was born in Prague as a sixth child to a family of a bookbinder who produced boxes for cartridges. She met Karel Hynek Mácha as an actor in Václav Kliment Klicpera's drama Kytka in 1833. After the rehearsal in a private Czech theatre in the Old Town she, Mácha, and Tyl with his fiancée went to café U Suchých in Celetná. Mácha and Lori started a love affair. Mácha helped her father in his workshop and made love to his lover very often, and according to his Diary he was very possessive and selfish in the act. She got pregnant and in October 1836 gave birth to Ludvík (who died nine months later). Mácha found a new job in Litoměřice and was preparing a house there. He died unexpectedly on 6 November 1836 just shor of his 26th birthday. His funeral took place on the day of their intended wedding. In the following years Eleonora stayed in Prague and when her father died in 1848 she started a yarn workshop. She married a police officer called Sieh in 1849 and they moved to Lwów together. They had no children. After his death she moved back to Prague where she died and was buried in Vinohrady cemetery.

Mácha's Secret diary 
Diary of 1835 reveals Mácha's possessiveness and jealousy in his relationship with Eleonora. It describes sexual acts in details.

References

1817 births
1891 deaths
19th-century Czech people
19th-century Czech women